Karavadi is a village in Prakasam district of the Indian state of Andhra Pradesh. It is located in Ongole mandal of Ongole revenue division.

References

Villages in Prakasam district